St John the Baptist Church, Winchester is a Church of England parish church in Winchester, England.

The parish is officially named "St John the Baptist with St Martin Winnall, Winchester" although the church of St Martin at Winnall was demolished in 1971. The parish is joined with the parish of "All Saints with St Andrew Chilcomb" to form the East Winchester Benefice.

References

Church of England church buildings in Hampshire
Grade I listed churches in Hampshire
St John